Lingaraja Temple is a Hindu temple dedicated to Shiva and is one of the oldest temples in Bhubaneswar, the capital of the Indian state of Odisha, India. The temple is the most prominent landmark of Bhubaneswar city and one of the major tourist attractions of the state.

The Lingaraja temple is the largest temple in Bhubaneswar. The temple represents the quintessence of the Kalinga architecture and culminating the medieval stages of the architectural tradition at Bhubaneswar. The temple is believed to be built by the kings from the Somavamsi dynasty, with later additions from the Ganga rulers. The temple is built in the Deula style that has four components namely, vimana (structure containing the sanctum), jagamohana (assembly hall), natamandira (festival hall) and bhoga-mandapa (hall of offerings), each increasing in the height to its predecessor. The temple complex has 50 other shrines and is enclosed by a large compound wall.

Bhubaneswar is called the Ekamra Kshetra as the deity of Lingaraja was originally under a mango tree (Ekamra) as noted in Ekamra Purana, a 13th-century Sanskrit treatise. The temple is active in worship practises, unlike most other temples in Bhubaneswar. The temple has images of Vishnu, possibly because of the rising prominence of Jagannath sect emanating from the Ganga rulers who built the Jagannath Temple in Puri in the 12th century. The central deity of the temple, Lingaraja, is worshipped as Shiva.

Lingaraja temple is maintained by the Temple Trust Board and the Archaeological Survey of India (ASI). The temple has an average of 6,000 visitors per day and receives lakhs of visitors during festivals. Shivaratri festival is the major festival celebrated in the temple and event during 2012 witnessed 200,000 visitors.  The temple compound is not open to non-Hindus, but there is a viewing platform beside the wall offering a good view of the main exteriors.  This was originally erected for a visit by Lord Curzon when Viceroy.

History

Lingaraja, literally means the king of Lingam, the iconic form of Shiva. Shiva was originally worshipped as Krutivasa and later as Harihara and is commonly referred to as Tribhuvaneshwara (also called Bhubaneswar), the master of three worlds, namely, heaven, earth, and netherworld. His consort is called Bhuvaneshvari or Gopaluni.

The temple in its present form dates back to the last decade of the eleventh century. There is evidence that part of the temple was built during the sixth century CE as mentioned in some of the seventh century Sanskrit texts. Fergusson believes that the temple might have been initiated by Lalat Indu Keshari who reigned from 615 to 657 CE. The Assembly hall (jagamohana), sanctum and temple tower were built during the eleventh century, while the Hall of offering (bhoga-mandapa) was built during the twelfth century. The natamandira was built by the wife of Salini between 1099 and 1104 CE. By the time the Lingaraja temple was completely constructed, the Jagannath (form of Vishnu) sect had been growing in the region, which historians believe, is evidenced by the co-existence of Vishnu and Shiva worship at the temple. The kings of Ganga dynasty were ardent followers of Vaishnavism and built the Jagannath Temple at Puri in the 12th century.

As per some accounts, the temple is believed to have been built by the Somavanshi king Yayati I (1025-1040), during the 11th century CE. Jajati Keshari shifted his capital from Jajpur to Bhubaneswar which was referred to as Ekamra Kshetra in the Brahma Purana, an ancient scripture. One of the Somavamsi queens donated a village to the temple and the Brahmins attached to the temple received generous grants. An inscription from the Saka year 1094 (1172 CE) indicates gifts of gold coins to the temple by Rajaraja II. Another inscription of Narasimha I from the 11th century indicates offer of beetel leaves as tambula to the presiding deity. Other stone inscriptions in the temple indicate royal grants from Chodaganga to the nearby village people.

K.C. Panigrahi mentions that Yayti I had no time to build the temple and it should have been initiated by his sons Ananta Kesari and Udyota Kesari (believed to be other names of Yayati II as well). The argument provided against the view is that is his weak successors could not have constructed such a magnificent structure.

Architecture

The Lingaraja temple is the largest temple in Bhubaneswar. James Fergusson (1808–86), a noted critic and historian rated the temple as "one of the finest examples of purely Hindu temple in India". Alongside the inner face of the boundary wall, there is a terrace to protect the compound wall against outside aggression. The door in the gate of the entrance porch is made of sandalwood.

The Lingaraja temple faces east and is built of sandstone and laterite. The main entrance is located in the east, while there are small entrances in the north and south. The temple is built in the Deula style that has four components namely, vimana (structure containing the sanctum), jagamohana (assembly hall), natamandira (festival hall) and bhoga-mandapa (hall of offerings), with all four in axial alignment with descending height. The dance hall was associated with the raising prominence of the devadasi system that existed during the time. The various units from the Hall of offering to the tower of the sanctum increase in height.

The bhogamandapa (Hall of offering) measures * from the inside,  * from the outside and has four doors in each of the sides. The exterior walls of the hall has decorative sculptures of men and beast. The hall has a pyramidal roof made of up several horizontal layers arranged in sets of two with intervening platform. It bears an inverted bell and a kalasa in the top. The natamandira (festival hall) measures * from the inside,  * from the outside, has one main entrance and two side entrances. The side walls of the hall has decorative sculptures displaying women and couples. It has a flat roof sloping in stages. There are thick pylons inside the hall.
The hall has a pyramidal roof made of up several horizontal layers arranged in sets of two with intervening platform as in the Hall of offering. The facade to the entrances are decorated with perforated windows with lion sitting on hind legs. The inverted bell above second unit is adorned by kalasa and lions. It is covered with decorative design and seated lion projecting from the walls. The sanctum is square in shape from the inside. The tower walls are sculpted with female figures in different poses.

The temple has a vast courtyard mired with hundreds of small shrines.

Religious significance

Bhubaneswar is called the Ekamra Kshetra as the deity of Lingaraja was originally under a mango tree (Ekamra). Ekamra Purana, a Sanskrit treatise of the 13th century mentions that the presiding deity was not seen as lingam (an aniconic form of Shiva) during the Satya and Treta yugas and only during the Dvapara and Kali yugas, it emerged as a lingam. The lingam in the temple is a natural unshaped stone that rests on a Sakti. Such a lingam is called Krutibasa or Swayambhu and is found in 64 places in different parts of India. With the advent of the Ganga dynasty in the early 12th century,  during the period.

It is attributed the raising prominence of Jagannath sect that became predominant during the construction of the temple. The Gangas remodelled the temple and introduced certain Vaishnavite elements like images of Vaishnava Dwarapalas namely Jaya and Prachanda, The flag of the temple was fixed to a Pinaka bow instead of trident usually found In Shiva temples

Festival and worship practises
As per Hindu legend, an underground river originating from the Lingaraja temple fills the Bindusagar Tank (meaning ocean drop) and the water is believed to heal physical and spiritual illness. The water from the tank is thus treated sacred and pilgrims take a holy dip during festive occasions.
The central deity of the temple, Lingaraja, is worshipped as Shiva . .

Shivaratri is the main festival celebrated annually in Phalgun month when thousands of devotees visit the temple. Apart from a full day of fasting, bel leaves are offered to Lingaraja on this auspicious day. The main celebrations take place at night when devotees pray all night long. The devout usually break their fast after the Mahadipa (a huge lamp) is lit on the spire of the temple. This festival commemorates Lingaraja having slain a demon. Thousands of bol bom pilgrims carry water from river Mahanadi and walk all the way to the temple during the month of Shravana every year. Sunian day is observed from royal times in the month of Bhandra, a day when temple servants, peasants and other holders of temple lands offer loyalty and tribute to Lingaraja.
Chandan Yatra (Sandalwood ceremony) is a 22-day festival celebrated in the temple when servants of the temple disport themselves in a specially made barge in Bindusagar tank. The deities and servants of the temples are anointed with sandalwood paste to protect from heat. Dances, communal feasts, and merrymaking are arranged by the people associated with the temple.

Every year the chariot festival (Ratha-Yatra) of Lingaraja is celebrated on Ashokashtami. The deity is taken in a chariot to Rameshwar Deula temple. Thousands of devotees follow and pull brightly decorated chariots containing the idols of Lingaraja, Gopaluni And Vasudeva.

The Lingaraja temple is active in worship practises, unlike the other ancient temples of Bhubaneshwar which are not active worship centres. Non Hindus are not allowed inside the temple, but it can be viewed from the viewing platform located outside the temple. The viewing platform and the back of the temple can be reached via a laneway located to the right of the main entrance of the temple. Sanctity of the temple is maintained by disallowing dogs, unbathed visitors, menstruating women and families that encountered birth or death in the preceding 12 days. In case of a foreign trespass, the temple follows a purification ritual and dumping of prasad (food offering) in a well.

Religious practices

The image of Lingaraja is abluted with water (called ) several times a day and decorated with flowers, sandal paste and cloth. Hemlock or hemlock flowers which are generally offered in other Shiva temples is not allowed in the Lingaraja temple. Bilva leaves (Aegle marmelos) and tulasi (Ocimum sanctum) are used in daily worship. Offerings of cooked rice, curries and sweets are displayed in the bhogamandapa (hall of offering) and the divinity is invoked to accept them amidst scores of chanting of Sanskrit texts. Coconut, ripe plantains and kora-khai are generally offered to Lingaraja by the pilgrims. Bhang beverage is offered to Lingaraja by some devotees especially on the day of Pana Sankranti (Odia new year).

The Lingaraja temple is open from 6 a.m. to about 9 p.m. and is intermittently closed during bhoga (food offering) to the deity. During early morning, lamps in the cella are lit to awaken Lingaraja from his sleep, ablution is performed, followed by adoration and arati (waving of light). The temple is closed at about 12 noon until about 3.30 p.m.  A ceremony is known as  Mahasnana (ablution) is performed once the doors are closed, followed by pouring of Panchamrita (a mixture of milk, curdled milk, clarified butter, honey, and ghee) upon the deity for purification. At about 1:00 pm, a ripe plantain is divided into two, one half is offered to Sun god and the other half to Dwarapala (the guarding deities in the doorway).  Between 1 p.m. and 1:30 p.m.  the food offering called Ballabha Bhoga (breakfast containing curdled milk, curd, and vegetables) is offered to the deity. The consecrated food is carried to the temple of Parvati and placed before her as an offering, a practice commonly observed by the orthodox Hindu housewives. At about 2 pm, the Sakala Dhupa (morning's offering of food) takes place. After the food is offered to Lingaraja, the offerings are carried to the temple of Parvati to serve her.  An offering called Bhanda Dhupa is carried out at 3:30 p.m. at the hall of the offering. This food is later offered by the inmates to the pilgrims as Mahaprasada.

A light refreshment known as Ballabha Dhupa is offered to the deity at around 4:30 pm. At around 5:00 pm, Dwipahar Dhupa (mid-day meal) is offered. At around 7 pm, another offering called Palia Badu is placed before the deity. Sandhya arati (waving of lights in the evening) is performed during that time. Another light meal called Sahana Dhupa is offered at around 8:30 pm. After the meals, the ceremony of waving light (arati) is performed before the deity. At 9.30 pm, the last service of the day, Bada Singara (the great decoration) is performed when the deity is decorated with flowers and ornaments after which a light food offering is made. A wooden palanquin is laid in the room, incense is lighted, drinking water is served and prepared betel is placed. Panchabaktra Mahadeva comes to the palanquin and returns to his own abode after the arati is performed. This is a bronze image of Mahadeva having five faces and Parvati in his lap. Each of these ceremonies is accompanied by ritual observances and recitations of mantras (Sanskrit texts) specified for each occasion.

Temple staff and administration

King Jajati Keshari, believed to be the founder of the Lingaraja temple, deputed Brahmins who had migrated to south India as temple priests over the local Brahmins on account of their increased knowledge of Shaivism, due to increasing invasions from Muslim invaders. The focus was to enhance the temple practises from tribal rites to Sanskritic. Bose (1958) identified 41 services with the involvement of 22 separate castes and Mahaptra (1978) identified 30 services. It is understood from the records that kings and temple managers of different times introduced or discontinued certain services, fairs, offerings, and caste-centred core services during their regime. As of 2012, the temple practised 36 different services.

In modern times, the Lingaraja temple priests are from three communities, namely Pujapanda Nijog, Brahman Nijog and Badu Nijog. The Badu are non-Brahmin servant groups, whose origin is not ascertained due to unavailability of authentic records, while they are described as Vadu in chapter 62 of the Ekamrapurana. The caste group of Badu is called Niyoga, which elects the officers every year during the Sandalwood festival. Every Badu undergoes three distinct rites, namely, ear-piercing, marriage, and god-touching. Historically, the Badus performed five different temple duties - Paliabadu and Pharaka, which were considered important and Pochha, Pahada and Khataseja, which were considered inferior. From 1962, only Paliabadu and Pharaka practises are followed and the others are discontinued. The Badus also carry out ablution and dressing of the images of Siddhaganesh and Gopalini.
The temple is maintained by the Temple Trust Board and the Archaeological Survey of India (ASI). The temple is guarded by security personnel deputed by the Police Commissioner of Bhubaneswar and security guards appointed by the temple administration. The temple has an average of 6,000 visitors every day and receives lakhs of visitors during festivals. The Shivaratri festival during 2012 witnessed 200,000 visitors. As of 2011, the annual income of Lingaraja temple from hundis (donation boxes) is around 1.2 million per annum. Another 4 million is collected annually from other sources like rents from shops, cycle stands and agriculture lands. Starting 2011, the temple charges an amount for six types of religious worship (special pujas) carried out by the devotees.

Gallery

Notes

References

External links

 

Ancient Indian culture
11th-century Hindu temples
Hindu temples in Bhubaneswar
Shiva temples in Odisha
Vishnu temples
Archaeological monuments in Odisha
Sandstone buildings in India